Samuel Hodgson (21 January 1919 – 2000) was an English professional footballer who played as a wing half. Sammy's brother John Venner Hodgson also played for Grimsby Town and later Doncaster Rovers where he also became manager. Sammy followed his brother to Doncaster and later became trainer at Workington town AFC

References

1919 births
2000 deaths
Sportspeople from Seaham
Footballers from County Durham
English footballers
Association football wing halves
Seaham Colliery F.C. players
Grimsby Town F.C. players
Mansfield Town F.C. players
English Football League players